This is a list of House of Assembly results for the 2021 Tasmanian state election.

Results summary
The election result was in doubt for multiple days due to the presence of two independents in Clark, and it being in doubt as to whether both would be elected, or an additional Liberal and one independent would be elected. Labor leader Rebecca White conceded the election at approximately 10pm on election night. Despite it at the time being unclear as to whether his party would govern in minority or majority, Liberal Premier Peter Gutwein also claimed victory on election night. On 12 May 2021, the count in Clark completed, electing 2 Liberals in Clark, and as a result giving the party majority government.

Results by electoral division

Bass

Braddon

Clark

Franklin

Lyons

See also 

 2021 Tasmanian state election
 Candidates of the 2021 Tasmanian state election
 Members of the Tasmanian House of Assembly, 2021–2025

References

Results of Tasmanian elections
2021 elections in Australia